Pig Meat may refer to:

 Pigmeat, another name for pork
 Pigmeat Markham (1904–1981),  African-American entertainer
 "Heart Beat, Pig Meat", a song by Pink Floyd